Raviwar Peth is one of the Peths in the city of Pune, India.  The ancient name of this place was Malkapur. This area was developed by Nilopant Mujumdar in 1670. Raviwar Peth is famous for shops of Gold and Silver ornaments and for its plastic products market.  This area also has a wholesale textile market, well known in Pune.  Raviwar Peth has various cinema halls like Alpana, Vikas, Prabhat, Shree Krishna and Apollo. It is bordered by Budhwar Peth, Shukrawar Peth, Rasta Peth and Kasba Peth.

References

External links
Raviwar Peth wikimapia
Details of all Peths in Pune
Raviwar Peth Guide

References 

Peths in Pune
Retail markets in Pune